Alexander Winkler (born 26 January 1992) is a German professional footballer who plays as a centre-back for  club Hallescher FC.

Career
Winkler began his career with, Unterhaching who he joined from Bayern Munich's youth team in 2007, and made his 3. Liga debut four years later, as a substitute for the injured Jonas Hummels in a 4–1  defeat to Kickers Offenbach. He suffered an injury himself three games later, which ruled him out of action for almost two years, before he left Unterhaching at the end of the 2012–13 season. He signed for Wacker Burghausen II shortly afterwards, where he would spend one season before joining SpVgg Neckarelz of the Regionalliga Südwest in July 2014. Later he signed again for SpVgg Unterhaching.

On 4 January 2023, Winkler signed a 1.5-year contract with Hallescher FC.

References

External links
 
 

1992 births
Living people
German footballers
Footballers from Munich
Association football defenders
SpVgg Unterhaching players
SpVgg Unterhaching II players
SV Wacker Burghausen players
1. FC Kaiserslautern players
Hallescher FC players
3. Liga players
Regionalliga players